Extended collective licensing (ECL) are collective copyright and related rights laws and licensing agreements. ECL agreements by law apply to all rights holders in a class, whether they are members of the collecting society or not, and establish terms of licenses with users or classes of users.  The first ECL laws and agreements were established in the Nordic countries in the 1960s for television and radio broadcasting.

ECL laws and agreements
ECL is a form of collective rights management whereby ECL laws allow for freely negotiated copyright licensing contracts for the exclusive rights granted by copyright. ECL laws are designed specifically for mass use, where negotiating directly with individual copyright holders is not possible because of their sheer volume. Under ECL laws, collecting societies negotiate ECL agreements on behalf of their members, as well as non-members because ECL laws allow collecting societies to enter into ECL agreements on behalf of all rights owners of the category of rightsholder the collecting society represents. Once the collecting society and the user, such as a TV broadcaster, have negotiated an ECL agreement, it comes into force and covers only the types of copyrighted works for uses specified in the ECL licence.

ECL in Nordic countries
The first extended collective licensing (ECL) laws were established in Denmark, Finland, Iceland, Norway and Sweden (Nordic countries) in the 1960s. Committees in Denmark, Finland, Norway and Sweden, with participation from Iceland, reviewed copyright laws and proposed ECL for the use of literary and music works under copyright in radio and TV broadcasting. In subsequent years ECL has been extended to other copyrighted works and areas of use, including the reuse of broadcasts through re-broadcast, on demand services and mass digitisation by libraries.

Authors, performing artists, publishers and producers are well organised in Nordic countries and collecting societies have a high membership. Collecting societies cooperate in many instances to offer joint licensing agreements. According to Daniel Gervais these are ideal conditions for collective rights management of copyright and related rights through ECL.

The Nordic model
While individual ECL laws and agreements in Nordic countries vary depending on type of copyrighted works and area of use, the Nordic model shares the following characteristics:
 ECL laws assume that collecting societies represent copyright and related rights owners in a particular area and that collecting societies can conclude contracts, i.e. copyright licenses, on behalf of their members
 subject to certain conditions, such as representing a substantial number of rights owners, collecting societies can under ECL law apply to represent all rights owners on a non-exclusive basis in a specific category of copyrighted works
 ECL laws provide that a collecting society can through free negotiations conclude an ECL agreement with a user for certain uses
 ECL laws prescribes that this ECL agreement applies to members of that collecting society, as well as non-members
 ECL laws requires that collecting societies treat rights owners who are non-members in the same way they treat their members
 ECL laws gives non-members the right to individual remuneration, i.e. royalty payment, by the collecting society
 ECL laws typically gives non-members the right to exclude their works from ECL agreements so that a collecting society can not license their work under an ECL agreement (though not all ECL laws in Nordic countries provide an opt-out right)
 ECL laws and ECL agreements ensure that the user who has entered an ECL agreement with the collecting society is not subject to copyright infringement actions in relation to the use specified in the ECL agreement (this does not apply to works that are subject to an opt-out)

ECL in the United Kingdom 
The British Government introduced extended collective licensing into UK copyright law in 2013 as part of the Enterprise and Regulatory Reform Act. This was in part in recognition of the fact that collecting societies had for decades been offering licences that included the work of non-members. If a collecting society is granted the right by government to operate an ECL non-members can receive individual remuneration (i.e. royalty payments) as if they were a full member of a collecting society. Unlike some Scandinavian countries, non-members are given the right to opt out from any ECLs offered. The UK has introduced a general and flexible right for collecting societies to operate extended collective licences for many different purposes, as long as they can prove to government they are sufficiently representative of the sector they operate in. This contrasts to Swedish and Czech law where there is only a list of  specific uses to which licensing of this sort can be put.

ECL in the Czech Republic 
Extended collective licensing in the Czech Republic covers uses as wide as making available copyright works by libraries through to radio and television broadcasts.

EU law 
Paragraph 18 of the InfoSoc Directive preamble states that “This Directive is without prejudice to the agreements in the Member States concerning the management of rights such as extended collective licensing”.

The principle of collecting societies representing non-members can also be found in the Satellite and Cable Directive. The directive provides that authorisation regarding non-members is to be dealt with collectively. Article 3.2 of the directive outlines the following criteria for collective management of rights, which is allowed under the directive. It states that: 
"A Member State may provide that a collective agreement between a collecting society and a broadcasting organization concerning a given category of works may be extended to rightholders of the same category who are not represented by the collecting society, provided that:
 the communication to the public by satellite simulcasts a terrestrial broadcast by the same broadcaster, and
 the unrepresented rightholder shall, at any time, have the possibility of excluding the extension of the collective agreement to his works and of exercising his rights either individually or collectively."

Examples
There are many examples of ECLs in operation, including
 Much television and radio broadcast in Iceland, Sweden, Norway, Finland and Denmark.
 Many mass digitisations of in-copyright works by universities and libraries in Scandinavia are based on ECL. One example of this is the Bøkhylla project by the National Library of Norway which intends to digitise all books in the national library in Norwegian and make them available online.

See also
Voluntary collective licensing

References

 
Copyright law of the European Union
Copyright licenses